Palazzo Brandolin Rota is a palace in Venice, Italy, located in the Dorsoduro district and overlooking the Grand Canal, between the Gallerie dell'Accademia and Palazzo Contarini Polignac.

History
The palazzo was built in the 17th century, initially of only two floors. In the mid-18th century, the structure got to its present size and look. The palace was acquired in the second half of the 1800s by the nobleman Franz Edler von Hruschka. It is currently owned by the Brandolini Rota family.

In the 19th century, the palace was adapted to host the hotel Allbergo dell' Universo, and for a short time it became the home of the famous soprano Toti Dal Monte and poet Robert Browning. In more recent times, the palace hosted the Union of Societies, one of the last gentlemen's clubs in Italy. 

The building is now a private home.

Architecture
Palazzo Brandolin Rota is a three-storey building, with a mezzanine level between the ground floor and the first noble floor. The façade on the Grand Canal is quite simple, with a rounded water portal in the center. Each of the two noble floors—erected in different epochs but looking substantially the same—has nine round-headed openings, with the five central units joined to form pentaforas. The balustrades cover all the openings of the first noble floor and only the pentafora of the second one. The building has a raised façade on its top part, terminating with a tympanum of two square single-light windows and a pair of large chimneys.

Gallery

References

Houses completed in the 17th century
Brandolin Rota
Brandolin Rota
Renaissance architecture in Venice